Colette Guillopé is a French mathematician specializing in partial differential equations and fluid mechanics. She is a professor at Paris 12 Val de Marne University, where she is also the gender officer for the university.

Early life 
Guillopé's parents were both professors.

Education 
Guillopé earned a diplôme d'études approfondies. In 1977, Guillopé earned her doctorate at the Centre national de la recherche scientifique. She completed a thèse d'état in 1983 from the University of Paris-Sud under the supervision of Roger Temam.

Career 
Guillopé was a founding member of L'association femmes et mathématiques in 1987, and was its president from 1996 to 1998. She also led the association femmes & sciences from 2004 to 2008. In 2016 she became an officer in the Legion of Honour after already being a knight in the Legion.

She was president of French women mathematicians.

References

Year of birth missing (living people)
Living people
French mathematicians
Women mathematicians
Officiers of the Légion d'honneur